The Singapore Gold Cup is a thoroughbred horse race held annually in November at Singapore Turf Club. Contested on turf over a left-handed course, the domestic Group 1 race is run over a distance of 2,000 metres and is open to local horses age three and older.

History
Inaugurated in 1924 at the Serangoon Road Race Course at Farrer Park, the Singapore Gold Cup was raced there until 1933, after which it was moved to the new Bukit Timah Race Course. It remained there until 1999 when the Bukit Timah facility was closed, to be replaced with a new Singapore Turf Club situated at Kranji.

The first Singapore Gold Cup held in 1924 at Farrer Park was won by Thelasocrete, who took home the prizemoney of $1,600.

In 1958, Abdul Mawi became the first local jockey to win the Gold Cup. In 2008, El Dorado won the event, making him the first ever Japanese-bred horse trained in Singapore to win a Singapore Group 1 race.

To mark its move from Bukit Timah to Kranji in 1999, Singapore Turf Club raised the prizemoney to $1 million and opened the race to international contenders, but the race returned to domestic status three years later. The residency conditions are specified on the Singapore Turf Club website.

As a result of World War II, there was no race run from 1942 through 1947.

Since inception, the race has been contested at various distances:
 2,000 metres: 2018 to Present
 2,011 metres: 1924–1931, 1933–1935, 1948, 1965–1968
 2,011 (about): 1936–1941, 1948, 1953–1964
 2,044 metres: 1949–1952
 2,212 metres: 1969–1975
 2,200 metres: 1976-2017
 2,414 metres: 1932

Records
Speed record: (at current distance of 2000 metres)
 2:01.02 – Mr Clint ( 2019)

Most wins:
 3 – Three Rings (1954, 1956, 1957)
 3 – El Dorado (2008, 2009, 2011)
Most wins by an owner:
 5 – Auric Stable (1974, 1977, 1985, 1991, 1995)

Most wins by a jockey:
 3 – Thomas Farthing (1936, 1939, 1941)
 3 – Alan J. Trevena (1963, 1966, 1968)
 3 - Ronnie Stewart (2008, 2009, 2011)

Most wins by a trainer:
 9 – Ivan Allan (1973, 1976, 1978, 1980, 1981, 1982, 1984, 1989, 1990)

Winners

 † 2004 winner Raul was originally named Devil's Gossip.
 † 1998 winner Three Crowns was originally named Interval.

References
 Video at YouTube of El Dorado winning the 2008 Singapore Gold Cup
 Winners of the Singapore Derby at the Singapore Turf Club website

Graded stakes races in Singapore
Open middle distance horse races
Recurring events established in 1924
Sport in Singapore